Ian Dale Mackey (born December 1986) is a Democratic member of the Missouri House of Representatives, representing the 99th House district, which is in St. Louis County. He previously represented the 87th House district.

Life and career
Mackey graduated from Westminster College in Fulton, Missouri, and taught at a Reggio Emilia early childhood center at Harvard University while earning a JD from Suffolk University Law School in Boston.

He was elected to represent the 87th district of the Missouri House of Representatives on November 6, 2018, beating Republican Steven Bailey with 67% of the vote. He ran unopposed for the seat again in the general election on November 3, 2020, winning 100% of the votes cast.

After statewide redistricting in 2022, Mackey ran to represent the newly-formed 99th House district, beating Republican LaVanna Wrobley with 65.4% of the vote. 

Mackey is openly gay.  In an April 2022 floor speech, Mackey passionately spoke out against a bill that would ban transgender students from participating in youth sports; in the speech, he also confronted and criticized Missouri state representative Chuck Basye for supporting the bill. A video of the speech went viral on TikTok.

Electoral History

References

External links

Personal website

1986 births
21st-century American politicians
Gay politicians
LGBT state legislators in Missouri
Living people
Mackey, Ian